Lowe "Junior" Wren (December 10, 1929October 8, 2003) was a professional American football defensive back in the National Football League (NFL) and the American Football League (AFL). He played for the NFL's Cleveland Browns (1956–1959) and Pittsburgh Steelers (1960) and the AFL's New York Titans (1961).

References

1929 births
2003 deaths
All-American college baseball players
Baseball players from Kansas City, Missouri
Players of American football from Kansas City, Missouri
American football safeties
American football cornerbacks
Missouri Tigers football players
Missouri Tigers baseball players
Cleveland Browns players
Pittsburgh Steelers players
New York Titans (AFL) players